Rogers Cup may refer to:

Rogers Cup (soccer), see Canadian Soccer League championship final 
Rogers Cup (tennis), see Canadian Open (tennis)